Abbasabad-e Sargorich (also Romanized as ‘Abbāsābād-e Sargorīch) is a village in Mehruiyeh Rural District, in the Central District of Faryab County, Kerman Province, Iran. At the 2006 census, its population was 91, in 21 families.

References 

Populated places in Faryab County